Rozell is a surname. Notable people with the surname include:

Herb Rozell (born 1931), American politician
Mark J. Rozell, American academic administrator

See also
Rodell (surname)